Robert Louis Paul DiPietro (September 1, 1927 – September 3, 2012) was an American professional baseball player, an outfielder whose career lasted for 13 seasons (1947–1959). He had a brief trial as a right fielder in Major League Baseball for the Boston Red Sox during the final month of the 1951 season. He was born in San Francisco, California.

In four MLB games played and 11 official at bats, DiPietro collected one hit, a single in his fourth and final game September 30 against Spec Shea of the New York Yankees, for an .091 batting average. He did score a run or collect an RBI. As a fielder, he appeared in three games and recorded four outs with one assist and committed one error for a .833 fielding percentage.

Sources

External links
, or Retrosheet, or SABR Biography Project

1927 births
2012 deaths
Baseball players from San Francisco
Birmingham Barons players
Boston Red Sox players
Lácteos de Pastora players
Louisville Colonels (minor league) players
Major League Baseball right fielders
Portland Beavers players
San Antonio Missions players
San Diego Padres (minor league) players
San Francisco Seals (baseball) players
San Jose Red Sox players
San Jose State Spartans baseball players
Scranton Red Sox players